Dahuakuri also known as Dohuakuri, is a small village located in Bansihari subdivision of Dakshin Dinajpur district in West Bengal, India.

Location 
Balurghat is the district headquarters of this village. Brajaballavpur is the gram panchayat of this village. The village code of this village is 311659.

Population 

See also 

 Rangapukur village in Dakshin Dinajpur. 
 Kalyani village in Dakshin Dinajpur.

References

Villages in Dakshin Dinajpur district